The Sellal bleak (Alburnus sellal) is a species of ray-finned fish in the genus Alburnus. It can be found in the drainage basins of the Queiq River and the Tigris–Euphrates river system in Iran, Iraq, Syria and Turkey. A recent study has found that Alburnus mossulensis was probably a synonym of Alburnus sellal.

References 

sellal
Taxa named by Johann Jakob Heckel
Fish described in 1843